Good Hands is a 2001 Estonian-Latvian comedy and crime film directed by Peeter Simm and based on the novel Arnold by Toomas Raudam.

Plot

Cast
Rēzija Kalniņa as Margita 
Lembit Ulfsak as Adolf
Tõnu Kark as Dr. Lepik
Tiit Sukk as Arnold
Atis Tenbergs as Pavo
Maija Apine as Oksana
Leonarda Kļaviņa as Evija
Gert Raudsep as Indrek
Regnārs Vaivars as Arturs
Lauri Nebel as Peeter
Aleksander Okunev as Truck Driver
Kristel Elling as Lady on TV Show 
Laine Mägi as Show Hostess
Margus Prangel as Archie
Janek Joost as Wello
Elina Reinold as Nurse
Aarne Soro as Border Guard
Dainis Gadelis as Police Officer in Latvia
Uldis Dumpis as Doctor
Linda Skaistlauka
Svetlana Bless
Aksels Ilmārs Ozoliņš

Accolades
Awards:
 2001: KINOSHOCK - Open Film Festival for states of the CIS and Estonia, Latvia and Lithuania (Anapa, Russia), 2001, Grand Prix
 2001: The National Film Festival Lielais Kristaps (Latvia), best film director (Peeter Simm), best actor (Rēzija Kalniņa), best screenwriting (Toomas Raudam, Peeter Simm)
 2002: European Film Festival (Lecce, Italy), Grand Prix, best screenwriting (Toomas Raudam, Peeter Simm)

References

External links
 
 Good Hands, entry in Estonian Film Database (EFIS)

2001 films
Estonian comedy films
Estonian-language films